Cape Denison is a rocky point at the head of Commonwealth Bay in George V Land, Antarctica. It was discovered in 1912 by the Australasian Antarctic Expedition (1911–14) under Douglas Mawson, who named it for Sir Hugh Denison of Sydney, a patron of the expedition. The cape was the site of the expedition's main base. Called by Mawson "the windiest place on Earth", the site experiences fierce katabatic winds.

Historic site
The site, including Mawson's Huts, Boat Harbour and the historic artefacts contained within its waters, has been designated a Historic Site or Monument (HSM 77), following a proposal by Australia to the Antarctic Treaty Consultative Meeting.

First aeroplane in Antarctica
The Air-tractor sledge, the first aeroplane to be brought to Antarctica (in 1912) was stationed at Cape Denison, although it never took to the air on the continent because it was damaged before being shipped there. The aircraft, a Vickers R.E.P. Type Monoplane (the first aircraft type to be built by Vickers) was used briefly as a "propeller driven snow tractor" and then abandoned, as the pistons seized up due to the cold.

Relic found on 1 January 2010
On New Year's Day, 2010, the carpenter of the latest expedition to Cape Denison came across small (150mm) pieces of the fuselage tubing in the harbour at a very low tide (January 2010 was a month with a 'blue moon'). The pieces found were cut from the final section of the airframe and constituted the fittings for a rudder.  An attempt had been made by Mawson's team to fabricate a metal ice rudder. This device replaced the original rudder (which did not work at the low speeds attained by the air tractor).  The original rudder is preserved in Mawson's Hut at Cape Denison, while the ice rudder is in the Antarctic Division at Hobart, Tasmania.

The remains of the fuselage are probably still buried under the ice near Mawson's Huts.  The ice is 3m deep and the remains are about 30m from the edge of the harbour.  An attempt was to be made in December 2010 to excavate the site – a similar excavation in 2008 nearby did not find any remains, but since then more sophisticated equipment (magnetometer, ground penetrating radar, metal detector, differential GPS, ice drilling) has been used and a more precise position found. However, this work has been delayed, in 2010-11 by logistical constraints, and in 2011-12 and 2012-13 by the presence of giant iceberg B9B which has locked in fast ice and prevented the French Antarctic supply vessel L'Astrolabe from entering Commonwealth Bay.

Adélie penguin colony
Cape Denison once supported a large colony of Adélie penguins with perhaps 150,000 members. In 2010, a large iceberg trapped the colony, making access to the sea difficult and threatening the lives of all the penguins. By 2013, only 10,000 remained and by 2016, they were reported in danger of being "wiped out". Media reports were exaggerated however and in response, the authors released this update:

The 102 ha colony site has been designated an Important Bird Area (IBA) by BirdLife International.

References

External links

 Key Publishing Ltd Aviation Forums
 Australian Antarctic Division > Home of the Blizzard > Cape Denison: Introduction Accessed 10 October 2013.

Important Bird Areas of Antarctica
Penguin colonies
Cape Denison
Denison
Cape Denison